St. Thaddeus the Apostle Church of Ddmashen (also St. Tadevos the Apostle Church) is a 7th-century Armenian church located within the village of Ddmashen in the Gegharkunik Province of Armenia. Named after Saint Thaddeus the Apostle, the church is considered by some to be the fourth most important example of its style of architecture after the Cathedral of Talin, Ptghavank, and Aruchavank. Following structural damage caused by an earthquake, the drum was replaced in 1907 by a sixteen-sided one in an architectural style that was different from that of the original. Aside from the aforementioned alteration, there have not been any other major changes to the church. A large cemetery is situated south of the church, consisting mostly of unmarked grave stones.

Architecture 
The church of S. Tadevos has a large cruciform rectangular-plan. A single conical dome rests above a sixteen-sided drum with eight windows that let light into the interior of the structure. There are also niches in the façades between each of the windows that surround the drum. There is a single small window at the apse, while there are ten larger windows light the nave, and a window in each of the prayer rooms or "studies" adjacent to the apse. The exterior and interior of the church are relatively void of any decoration. Molding above the windows is undecorated as well.  Within the interior of the church is a painted wooden altar.

Gallery

References 

 
 DDMASHEN (Gegharkunik) - Union of Communities of Armenia

External links

Ddmashen Church, Armeniapedia.org

7th-century churches in Armenia
Armenian Apostolic churches in Armenia
Buildings and structures in Gegharkunik Province